The Foundation for Democracy in Iran is a private, non-profit organization established in 1995 with grants from the National Endowment for Democracy (NED), to promote regime change in Iran. The former board members of this NGO are David M. Beasley, Joshua Muravchik, Peter W. Rodman, and Dr. Mehdi Rouhani.

James Woolsey and Frank Gaffney  are among its advisory board. Its website delivers news and intelligence concerning Iran.

References

External links
 The Foundation for Democracy in Iran Homepage
 Board Members of the Foundation for Democracy in Iran
 About Us

Political and economic research foundations in the United States
Intelligence websites
Politics of Iran